Zulvin Malik Zamrun (born February 19, 1988) is an Indonesian former footballer who plays as a winger.

Personal life 
He is the twin brother of Zulham Zamrun which is a member of Indonesian national football team.

Career 
In January 2015, he signed with Pusamania Borneo.

References

External links 
 

1988 births
Living people
People from Ternate
Sportspeople from North Maluku
Indonesian footballers
Liga 1 (Indonesia) players
Persiter Ternate players
Persiba Balikpapan players
Mitra Kukar players
Borneo F.C. players
Indonesian twins
Twin sportspeople
Association football wingers